Gul Hameed Bhatti (1947 – 4 February 2010) was a Pakistani journalist, editor and a leading sports writer. Known as Pakistan's "Encyclopaedia of Cricket", Bhatti wrote for The Cricketer, published from Karachi.

Early life and career
Gul Hammed Bhatti was born in Lahore in September 1947. After completing his education, he first trained as a commercial airlines pilot but lost interest in it. Then he worked in the public relations department at the Pakistan Trade Development Corporation. Bhatti later turned to his real passion - sports journalism, joining The Cricketer (magazine). Initially he used to report on the cricket club scene from Lahore. Later he became the editor of this magazine. He joined forces with Abid Ali Kazi and Nauman Badr and launched the Cricket Statistians Association. It is widely believed in Pakistan that Bhatti, during his lifetime, had built and was maintaining one of the most comprehensive database on Pakistani cricket. In 1990, Bhatti joined The News International (newspaper) as a sports editor.

Death and legacy
Bhatti suffered with ill health after the death of his wife Razia Bhatti in 1996. Razia Bhatti had also served as editor of Herald (Pakistan) and later Newsline (magazine). After a battle with throat cancer, Gul Hameed Bhatti  suffered a brain stroke. He died on February 4, 2010, after suffering a second stroke at age 63. He is widely considered to be a key figure who helped usher in a new era in sports journalism in Pakistan. Gul's passion for cricket rubbed off on everyone who dealt with him.

References

External links 
 A tribute by Jalal Hamid Bhatti (brother)
 
 

1947 births
2010 deaths
Deaths from cerebrovascular disease
Pakistani male journalists
Pakistani magazine editors
Pakistani sportswriters
Journalists from Karachi
Journalists from Lahore